In Eastern Orthodoxy, autonomy designates a type of limited self-government of a church (group) toward its mother church. An autonomous church is self-governing in some aspects, which differentiates it from a non-autonomous church. The aspects on which the autonomous church is self-governing depends on the decision of the mother church. A church that is autonomous has its highest-ranking bishop, such as an archbishop or metropolitan, approved (or ordained) by the primate of the mother church.

 means "head" in Greek, whereas  means "law". Hence, autocephalous denotes self-headed, or a "head unto itself"; and autonomous denotes "self-legislated".

See also 

 Eastern Orthodox Church organization#Autonomous Eastern Orthodox churches
 Autocephaly
 Eparchy
 Tomos (Eastern Orthodox Church)
 Canon law of the Eastern Orthodox Church

References

Further reading 

 
 
 

Canon law of the Eastern Orthodox Church
Christian terminology
Ecclesiology